Ellen Hamilton (16 December 1889 – 1 November 1970) was a Swedish fencer. She competed in the women's individual foil event at the 1924 Summer Olympics.

References

External links
 

1889 births
1970 deaths
Swedish female foil fencers
Olympic fencers of Sweden
Fencers at the 1924 Summer Olympics
People from Karlskrona
Sportspeople from Blekinge County
20th-century Swedish women